The 1955–56 season was the tenth season in FK Partizan's existence. This article shows player statistics and matches that the club played during the 1955–56 season.

Players

Squad information

Friendlies

Competitions

Yugoslav First League

Yugoslav Cup

European Cup

First round

Quarter-finals

Mitropa Cup

Quarter-finals

Semi-finals

Statistics

Goalscorers 
This includes all competitive matches.

Score overview

See also
 List of FK Partizan seasons

External links
 Official website
 Partizanopedia 1955-56  (in Serbian)

FK Partizan seasons
Partizan